An aquamog is a machine for removing weeds growing over a body of water.  An aquamog was used in 2018 for removing water primrose from North Lake in San Francisco's Golden Gate Park.  A newspaper photo shows a machine similar to a backhoe on very wide crawlers.

Aquatic Environments, a Concord, California contractor, used an aquamog to scoop up muck at the Palace of Fine Arts lagoon, in a project expected to take 26 days.
 
The name aquamog was derived from the multi-purpose vehicle Unimog produced by Mercedes-Benz.

References 

Pest control
Agricultural machinery
Heavy equipment